Nationality words link to articles with information on the nation's poetry or literature (for instance, Irish or France).

Events

Works published
 Anonymous,  publication year uncertain; written before 1325; in couplets; Great Britain
 Hieronymus Angerianus, Erotopaegnion, Italian poet writing in Latin
 Stephen Hawes, The Comfort of Lovers, London: Wynkyn de Worde; Great Britain
 Thomas Murner, Germany:
 Schelmenzunft ("Guild of Rogues"); in which the narrator is the chosen scribe of the guild, with the duty of describing each member
 Narrenbeschwörung ("Muster of Fools")

Births
Death years link to the corresponding "[year] in poetry" article:
 Thomas Becon (died 1567), English (approximate date)
 Christovão Falcão (died c. 1557), Portuguese (approximate date)
 Thomas Sébillet (died 1589), French

Deaths
Birth years link to the corresponding "[year] in poetry" article:

See also

 Poetry
 16th century in poetry
 16th century in literature
 French Renaissance literature
 Grands Rhétoriqueurs
 Renaissance literature
 Spanish Renaissance literature

Notes

16th-century poetry
Poetry